Anouk Aimee Takam Kenmoe (born June 21, 1979 in Douala) is a Cameroonian professional footballer, who currently plays for Olympique Beja.

Career
He was released by FC Metallurg Lipetsk on July 2, 2009.

References

1979 births
Living people
Cameroonian footballers
Karlsruher SC players
FC Kuban Krasnodar players
FC Chernomorets Novorossiysk players
FC Baltika Kaliningrad players
FC SKA Rostov-on-Don players
FC Sokol Saratov players
FC Metallurg Lipetsk players
FC Sodovik Sterlitamak players
Association football forwards